Collegeville is a borough in Montgomery County, Pennsylvania, a suburb outside of Philadelphia on Perkiomen Creek. Collegeville was incorporated in 1896. It is the location of Ursinus College which opened in 1869. The population was 5,089 at the 2010 census.

History
The area which is present day Collegeville was part of the original William Penn purchase of "All the land lying on the Pahkehoma" in 1684.  In 1799, Perkiomen Bridge was constructed using funds raised from a special lottery approved by the Pennsylvania Legislature.  When the first post office in this area was established in 1847, it was called Perkiomen Bridge. In 1832, the first school for primary and secondary students was established and it was later renamed Freeland Public School in 1844.  In 1848, Henry A. Hunsicker built the "Freeland Seminary of Perkiomen Bridge."  Village around the school became known as Freeland.  In 1851, Abraham Hunsicker established the Pennsylvania Female College near present-day Glenwood Avenue. Ten years later, in 1861, the post office was moved and renamed Freeland.

When the trains first arrived in the area in 1868, there was a debate about naming of the station (Perkiomen Bridge vs Freeland). The local citizens had acquired notoriety when they had burned down the toll booth on the Perkiomen Bridge and thrown the gate into the river.  The rail company avoided any troubles by naming it "Collegeville" (the station was actually closer to the Pennsylvania Female College than either Freeland School or Perkiomen Bridge).  Ursinus College was founded a year later in 1869. Thus the name "Collegeville" precedes the establishment of Ursinus College and it is actually named after the other 4 year liberal arts college (Pennsylvania Female College) which closed in 1880. Collegeville was incorporated as Borough in 1896.

The Perkiomen Bridge and Perkiomen Bridge Hotel are listed on the National Register of Historic Places.

Geography
Collegeville is located at  (40.185554, -75.458273). It has a hot-summer humid continental climate (Dfa) and average monthly temperatures range from 31.0 °F in January to 75.7 °F in July. The hardiness zone is 7a bordering upon 6b.

Economy
Collegeville and the surrounding area are rapidly growing. Collegeville is home to Ursinus College and several local businesses. Outside the borough, Pfizer's pharmaceutical division and Dow Chemical share a global research and development campus. There is also a GlaxoSmithKline research and development facility. The Providence Town Center, an open-air shopping and restaurant mall, is located just outside Collegeville.

Collegeville is the home of the Church House (headquarters) of the Pennsylvania Southeast Conference of the United Church of Christ.

Demographics

As of the 2010 census, the population of the borough was 89.4% White, 4.0% Black or African American, 0.2% Native American, 3.8% Asian, and 1.9% were two or more races. 2.4% of the population were of Hispanic or Latino ancestry.

As of the census of 2000, there were 8,032 people, 1,408 households, and 1,010 families residing in the borough.  The racial makeup of the borough was 61.83% White, 31.19% African American, 0.10% Native American, 2.13% Asian, 0.01% Pacific Islander, 3.93% from other races, and 0.81% from two or more races. Hispanic or Latino of any race were 5.13% of the population. The 2000 census apparently included the population of State Correctional Institution - Graterford, located in nearby Skippack Township.

There were 1,408 households, out of which 38.3% had children under the age of 18 living with them, 61.9% were married couples living together, 7.2% had a female householder with no husband present, and 28.2% were non-families. 21.4% of all households were made up of individuals, and 5.7% had someone living alone who was 65 years of age or older. The average household size was 2.67 and the average family size was 3.17.

In the borough the population was spread out, with 12.9% under the age of 18, 17.6% from 18 to 24, 42.9% from 25 to 44, 21.4% from 45 to 64, and 5.2% who were 65 years of age or older. The median age was 35 years. For every 100 females there were 240.2 males. For every 100 females age 18 and over, there were 275.6 males.

The median income for a household in the borough was $77,499, and the median income for a family was $90,733. Males had a median income of $40,185 versus $39,236 for females. The per capita income for the borough was $23,080. About 1.0% of families and 2.0% of the population were below the poverty line, including none of those under age 18 and 2.1% of those age 65 or over.

Politics and government
Collegeville has a city manager form of government with a mayor and a seven-member borough council. The current mayor is Aidsand Wright-Riggins.

The borough is part of the Fourth Congressional District (represented by Rep. Madeleine Dean), the 150th State House District (represented by Rep. Joe Webster) and the 44th State Senate District (represented by Sen. Katie Muth).

State Correctional Institution – Phoenix is a state prison of the Pennsylvania Department of Corrections in Skippack Township; it has a Collegeville postal address.

Education
The borough of Collegeville is served by the Perkiomen Valley School District. Some nearby areas outside of the borough limits are served by Methacton School District and Spring-Ford Area School District.

There is also one private parochial school, Holy Cross Regional Catholic School, which serves grades K-8. Holy Cross was formed in 2012 by the merger of St. Eleanor in Collegeville and Sacred Heart in Royersford. Pope John Paul II High School in Royersford is the area Catholic high school.

The borough is also home to Ursinus College. Montgomery County Community College, with campuses in Blue Bell and Pottstown, provides community college services to Collegeville residents.

The Montgomery County Library & Information Network Consortium (MCLINC) operates area bookmobiles, and physical libraries serving the Collegeville area including the Perkiomen Valley Library at Schwenksville, the Lower Providence Community Library in Eagleville, the Royersford Free Public Library, the Norristown public library, and the Phoenixville Public Library of the Chester County Library System.

Transportation

The southern segment of highway PA 29 is the only numbered highway which directly serves Collegeville, running north to Allentown and south to Malvern. PA 29 has an interchange with US 422 southwest of Collegeville; US 422 heads east toward King of Prussia and Philadelphia and west toward Pottstown and Reading.

SEPTA operates bus Route 93 along Collegeville's Main Street and Ridge Pike, running southeast to the Norristown Transportation Center in Norristown and northwest to Pottstown.

Attractions 
Collegeville offers multiple attractions, including skydiving, numerous shops and restaurants, horse-back riding and its well-known car show.

Notable people
Horace Ashenfelter, winner of the steeplechase at the 1952 Summer Olympics at Helsinki and Sullivan Award winner as outstanding amateur athlete for the year 1952.
The Bloodhound Gang, rock band best known for their 2000 single, "The Bad Touch"
CM Punk, mixed martial artist and former professional wrestler, lived in Collegeville between December 2003 and August 2005
Jen Carfagno, meteorologist and broadcaster
Tim Cooney, pitcher in the Cleveland Guardians organization.
Joe DeRosa, stand-up comedian, author, actor and television writer
Elin Hilderbrand, romance novelist.
Michael R. Matz, an American Olympics equestrian rider and Thoroughbred horse trainer who won the 2006 Kentucky Derby.
J.D. Salinger, American author, attended Ursinus College in 1938

References

External links

Borough of Collegeville
Schools in Collegeville

Populated places established in 1698
Boroughs in Montgomery County, Pennsylvania
1698 establishments in Pennsylvania